Alexander Graham (11 July 1889 – 9 August 1972) was a Scottish professional football half back, best remembered for his time with in the Football League with Arsenal either side of the First World War.

Playing career

Early years 
Graham was born in Galston, Ayrshire and started playing for local club Hurlford United before moving to Lanarkshire where he played for Larkhall United and Larkhall Thistle.

Arsenal 
Graham was taken on trial by Woolwich Arsenal in December 1911 and was signed permanently the following January. After a year in the reserves he made his debut in a First Division match on 25 December 1912 against Notts County and played another 14 games that season. Graham either played at centre half or left half, at first mainly deputising for more established players such as Angus McKinnon.

By 1914–15, with Woolwich Arsenal now relegated to the Second Division, Graham had become a regular, but World War I brought with it the suspension of League football in England. Graham left Woolwich Arsenal to return to his native Scotland, where he guested for Vale of Leven, Hamilton Academical (two spells) and Third Lanark. After football in England resumed in 1919, he re-signed for Arsenal (who had won back promotion to the First Division) and retook his regular place at centre half. He was a regular for Arsenal's first three seasons after the war (from 1919 until 1922), but the arrival of Jack Butler meant Graham had competition for his place and at the start of 1922–23 he lost his regular centre half berth, though he continued to be used as a bit-part player deputising in other half-back positions for that season and the next one. He played 179 times for Arsenal in total, scoring 20 goals (many of them penalties) and departed Highbury in December 1924.

Brentford 
Graham joined Third Division South club Brentford in December 1924 for a £450 fee. He played 49 matches, scored 11 goals and also became player/assistant manager to Fred Halliday prior to the beginning of the 1925–26 season. He left Griffin Park following the appointment of Harry Curtis in May 1926.

International career 
Graham won a single international cap for Scotland, in a 2–0 win against Ireland on 26 February 1921.

Managerial career 
Graham had a player-manager spell at Southern League side Folkestone and later managed Botwell Mission.

Personal life 
Graham worked as a miner during World War I and later ran a confectionery and tobacco shop on Brentford High Street. He died at Whittington Hospital, Islington, in August 1972.

References

1889 births
1972 deaths
Footballers from East Ayrshire
Scottish footballers
Scotland international footballers
Arsenal F.C. players
Brentford F.C. players
English Football League players
Association football wing halves
Hurlford United F.C. players
Larkhall Thistle F.C. players
Scottish Football League players
Vale of Leven F.C. wartime guest players
Hamilton Academical F.C. wartime guest players
Folkestone F.C. players
Southern Football League players
Southern Football League managers
Hayes F.C. managers
Scottish miners
Third Lanark A.C. wartime guest players
Larkhall United F.C. players
Scottish Junior Football Association players
Scottish football managers